Andreyevka is a rural locality (a selo) and the administrative centre of Andreyevsky Selsoviet, Ilishevsky District, Bashkortostan, Russia. The population was 896 as of 2010. There are 18 streets.

Geography 
Andreyevka is located 30 km north of Verkhneyarkeyevo (the district's administrative centre) by road. Anachevo is the nearest rural locality.

References 

Rural localities in Ilishevsky District